Yan Naing Soe (born 31 January 1979) is a Burmese judoka. He competed at the 2016 Summer Olympics in the men's 100 kg event, in which he was eliminated in the third round by Karl-Richard Frey. He was the flag bearer for Myanmar at the Parade of Nations.

References

External links 
 

1979 births
Living people
Burmese male judoka
Olympic judoka of Myanmar
Judoka at the 2016 Summer Olympics
Judoka at the 2002 Asian Games
Judoka at the 2014 Asian Games
Southeast Asian Games medalists in judo
Southeast Asian Games bronze medalists for Myanmar
Southeast Asian Games silver medalists for Myanmar
Southeast Asian Games gold medalists for Myanmar
Competitors at the 2001 Southeast Asian Games
Asian Games competitors for Myanmar